The Qingdao Sports Center Stadium or officially Qingdao Conson Stadium is a multi-purpose stadium in Qingdao, Shandong, China. It is currently holds 45,000 people and used mostly for association football matches.

The stadium was invested by Qingdao Etsong Tobacco Group and opened in August 1999 as Etsong Sports Center Stadium. It was the home stadium of Qingdao Etsong Hainiu and Qingdao Hailifeng. The stadium was abandoned in 2006 due to safety problems. Qingdao Conson Development Group took charge the stadium in July 2008 and changed its name as Qingdao Conson Stadium. The stadium was renovated in 2012.

See also
 Conson Gymnasium
 Sports in China

References

External links
 Qingdao Yizhong Sports Center.

Buildings and structures in Qingdao
Football venues in Qingdao
Sport in Qingdao
Multi-purpose stadiums in China
Sports venues in Shandong